Volker Bräutigam (23 May 1939 – 31 May 2022) was a German composer, and church musician.

Life and career 
Bräutigam was born in the village of Frohnau in southeast Germany. From 1949 and 1953 he sang with the Dresdner Kreuzchor, at that time under the direction of Rudolf Mauersberger. In 1957 he entered the Musikhochschule Leipzig and remained there until 1962 studying composition under Johannes Weyrauch as well as conducting, piano, organ, and film music. After completing his studies he worked for the next two years as an assistant organist and a free-lance composer for the animation department of the East German film studio DEFA.
 
In the 1980s and early 90s he also taught organ and composition at the Evangelische Hochschule für Kirchenmusik Halle. He was appointed professor of the University of Music and Theatre Leipzig in 1993.

Bräutigam's compositions, which are primarily choral and organ music, are stylistically diverse. The critic for Westdeutsche Zeitung described his Epitaph for Maximilian Kolbe as "a work of surprising sounds, melodic lines, and chords, a piece that translates the ideas of contemporary music". Bernard Holland of The New York Times noted that his choral piece Drei Seligpreisungen (Three Beatitudes) was characterised by "long melodic lines with wide intervals, sometimes using them in opposing keys". His chorale prelude, Christ ist erstanden, has jazz influences.

Selected works 
 Epitaph for Maximilian Kolbe (1975).
 Aus der Tiefe rufe ich, Herr, zu dir (1970/1995)
 Drei Jazzverwandte Choralvorspiele

References

External links 
 
 Biography on bach-cantatas.com 
 Einführung: J.S.Bach Markus-Passion mit Evangelienmusik Volker Bräutigam - 2005 on the website of the  

1939 births
2022 deaths
People from Annaberg-Buchholz
Sacred music composers
20th-century classical composers
German classical organists
Academic staff of the University of Music and Theatre Leipzig